Sand Church is a chapel of the Church of Norway in Hadsel Municipality in Nordland county, Norway. It is located in the village of Sanden on the island of Austvågøya. It is an annex chapel for the Melbu parish which is part of the Vesterålen prosti (deanery) in the Diocese of Sør-Hålogaland. The white, wooden chapel was built in a long church style in 1914 to serve the southern part of Hadsel (on Austvågøya island). The chapel seats about 100 people. The building was also used as a school for many years, but the school closed in 1990.

History
The earliest existing historical records of the church date back to the year 1589, but the church was not new that year. There is some evidence that the church was founded in the 13th century. It was an annex chapel for the main Hadsel Church through the middle ages, and the priest would hold services there every third Sunday. After centuries standing on that site, the church was closed and torn down in 1810.

See also
List of churches in Sør-Hålogaland

References

Hadsel
Churches in Nordland
Wooden churches in Norway
20th-century Church of Norway church buildings
Churches completed in 1914
13th-century establishments in Norway
Long churches in Norway